DPANN is a superphylum of Archaea first proposed in 2013. Many members show novel signs of horizontal gene transfer from other domains of life. They are known as nanoarchaea or ultra-small archaea due to their smaller size (nanometric) compared to other archaea.

DPANN is an acronym formed by the initials of the first five groups discovered, Diapherotrites, Parvarchaeota, Aenigmarchaeota, Nanoarchaeota and Nanohaloarchaeota. Later Woesearchaeota and Pacearchaeota were discovered and proposed within the DPANN superphylum. In 2017, another phylum Altiarchaeota was placed into this superphylum. The monophyly of DPANN is not yet considered established, due to the high mutation rate of the included phyla, which can lead to the artifact of the long branch attraction (LBA) where the lineages are grouped basally or artificially at the base of the phylogenetic tree without being related. These analyzes instead suggest that DPANN belongs to Euryarchaeota or is polyphyletic occupying various positions within Euryarchaeota.

The DPANN groups together different phyla with a variety of environmental distribution and metabolism, ranging from symbiotic and thermophilic forms such as Nanoarchaeota, acidophiles like Parvarchaeota and non-extremophiles like Aenigmarchaeota and Diapherotrites. DPANN was also detected in nitrate-rich groundwater, on the water surface but not below, indicating that these taxa are still quite difficult to locate.

Characteristics 

They are characterized by being small in size compared to other archaea (nanometric size) and in keeping with their small genome, they have limited but sufficient catabolic capacities to lead a free life, although many are episymbionts that depend on a symbiotic or parasitic association with  other organisms. Many of their characteristics are similar or analogous to those of ultra-small bacteria (CPR group).

Limited metabolic capacities are a product of the small genome and are reflected in the fact that many lack central biosynthetic pathways for nucleotides, aminoacids, and lipids; hence most DPANN archaea, such as ARMAN archaea, which rely on other microbes to meet their biological requirements. But those that have the potential to live freely are fermentative and aerobic heterotrophs.

They are mostly anaerobic and cannot be cultivated. They live in extreme environments such as thermophilic, hyperacidophilic, hyperhalophilic or metal-resistant; or also in the temperate environment of marine and lake sediments. They are rarely found on the ground or in the open ocean.

Classification 

 Diapherotrites. Found by phylogenetic analysis of the genomes recovered from the groundwater filtration of a gold mine abandoned in the USA.
 Parvarchaeota and Micrarchaeota. Discovered in 2006 in acidic mine drainage from a US mine. They are of very small size and provisionally called ARMAN (Archaeal Richmond Mine acidophilic nanoorganisms).
 Woesearchaeota and Pacearchaeota. They have been identified both in sediments and in surface waters of aquifers and lakes, abounding especially in saline conditions.
 Aenigmarchaeota. Found in wastewater from mines and in sediments from hot springs.
 Nanohalarchaeota. Distributed in environments with high salinity.
 Nanoarchaeota. They were the first discovered (in 2002) in a hydrothermal source next to the coast of Iceland. They live as symbionts of other archaea.

Phylogeny

Taxonomy
The currently accepted taxonomy is based on the List of Prokaryotic names with Standing in Nomenclature (LPSN) and National Center for Biotechnology Information (NCBI).

Super Phylum "DPANN" Rinke et al. 2013
 Phylum Altarchaeota Probst et al. 2018 (SM1)
 Class "Altarchaeia" corrig. Probst et al. 2014
 Order "Altarchaeales" corrig. Probst et al. 2014
 Phylum "Iainarchaeota" ["Diapherotrites" Rinke et al. 2013] (DUSEL-3)
 Class "Iainarchaeia" Rinke et al. 2020
 "Candidatus Forterrea" Probst & Banfield 2017 {0-14-0-20-30-16: CSSED10-239}
 Order "Iainarchaeales" Rinke et al. 2020
 Phylum  "Micrarchaeota" Baker & Dick 2013
 Class "Micrarchaeia" Vazquez-Campos et al. 2021
 Order "Anstonellales" Vazquez-Campos et al. 2021 (LFWA-IIIc) 
 Order "Burarchaeales" Vazquez-Campos et al. 2021 (LFWA-IIIb)
 Order "Fermentimicrarchaeales" Kadnikov et al. 2020
 Order "Gugararchaeales" Vazquez-Campos et al. 2021 (LFWA-IIIa)
 Order "Micrarchaeales" Vazquez-Campos et al. 2021
 Order "Norongarragalinales" Vazquez-Campos et al. 2021 (LFWA-II)
 Phylum "Undinarchaeota" Dombrowski et al. 2020
 Class "Undinarchaeia" Dombrowski et al. 2020
 Order "Undinarchaeales" Dombrowski et al. 2020
 Phylum "Huberarchaeota" Probst et al. 2019
 Class "Huberarchaeia" corrig. Probst et al. 2019
 Order "Huberarchaeales" Rinke et al. 2020
 Phylum "Aenigmatarchaeota" corrig. Rinke et al. 2013 (DSEG, DUSEL2)
 Class "Aenigmatarchaeia" corrig. Rinke et al. 2020
 Order "Aenigmatarchaeales" corrig. Rinke et al. 2020
 Phylum "Nanohalarchaeota" corrig. Rinke et al. 2013
 Class "Nanohalobiia" corrig.La Cono et al. 2020
 Order "Nanohalobiales" La Cono et al. 2020
 Class ?"Nanohalarchaeia" corrig. Narasingarao et al. 2012
 Order "Nanohalarchaeales"
 Phylum "Nanoarchaeota" Huber et al. 2002
 Class "Nanoarchaeia" Vazquez-Campos et al. 2021
 Order "Nanoarchaeales" Huber et al. 2011
 Order "Pacearchaeales" (DHVE-5, DUSEL-1)
 Order "Parvarchaeales" Rinke et al. 2020 (ARMAN 4 & 5)
 Order "Tiddalikarchaeales" Vazquez-Campos et al. 2021 (LFW-252_1)
 Order "Woesearchaeales" (DHVE-6)
 Phylum ?"Mamarchaeota"
 Order ?"Wiannamattarchaeales"

See also
 List of Archaea genera

References

External links 
 

Archaea
Extremophiles
Superphyla